Shahrah-e-Faisal, founded as Drigh Road, is a boulevard in Karachi that runs , from the Bhutto Underpass near Hotel Metropole in central Karachi, to Star Gate near Jinnah International Airport, where it becomes N-5 National Highway. 

This road is one of Karachi's busiest, and is used by approximately 250,000 cars and vehicles daily.

History
It is not clear when the road was built, however the first Air India flight took off on 15 October 1924, from Karachi's Drigh Road Aerodrome, and the record mentions the road. RAF Drigh Road was a Royal Air Force base, where T.E. Lawrence, who later was famously known as "Lawrence of Arabia," was stationed between 1927 and 1928.

In the 1970s, Shahrah-e-Faisal was part of the National Highway and thus belonged to the Government of Sindh. In 1977 under the dictatorship of General Zia-ul-Haq, Drigh Road was officially renamed Shahrah-e-Faisal after King Faisal of Saudi Arabia. The city of Lyallpur was also renamed Faisalabad in his honor that year. Only the road itself was renamed, and the Drigh Road name continues to be used in other contexts, such as Drigh Road railway station, Drigh Road Flyover, and Drigh Colony. The old name continues to be used informally.

In the 1980s, the Government of Sindh transferred the road to the Karachi Metropolitan Corporation. An estimated 250,000 or more above vehicles now use the road daily. 

In 1987, Shahrah-e-Faisal had around 30 billboards. By 2014, their number had grown to 140, from Hotel Metropole to Gora Qabristan, earning the Karachi Metropolitan Corporation Rs. 250 million per year. In 2018, the Supreme Court of Pakistan ordered these billboards removed because, over time, several had collapsed in strong winds, killing and injuring a number of people. In 2016, the Karachi Metropolitan Corporation decided to demolish the Drigh Road flyover, which needed multiple repairs since it was built in 1996. This flyover on Shahrah-e-Faisal takes traffic from the airport towards Gulshan-e-Iqbal.

Upgrades
2012 Solar-powered streetlights installed by Karachi Metropolitan Corporation.
2014 The majority of traffic signals have been removed only two remain. The conversion into a signal-free road began in 2010.
2016 A new traffic management plan was made.
2016 Rickshaws were banned for causing accidents and traffic problems.
2016 As part of the Karachi Mega Infrastructure Development Projects, greenery was added on each side, as well as the  green patches, and footpaths were built.
2016 Karachi Metropolitan Corporation spent Rs 70 million on the replacement of old bulbs with energy-saving mercury bulbs on roads in Karachi, starting with Shahrah-e-Faisal.
The area from Star Gate to the Finance and Trade Center was re-paved by the government of Sindh in Phase I of the Karachi Development Project. A complete overhaul of the Drigh Road Flyover was started after the completion of the Aan underpass.
2018 The area from the Finance and Trade Center to Metropole was re-paved.
2019 - Separate lane for motorbikes was made on Sharah-e-Faisal.

Traffic
Shahrah-e-Faisal is one of Karachi's busiest roads, and is the site of frequent traffic jams. The Road Traffic Injury and Prevention Center of Jinnah Postgraduate Medical Centre showed that at least one person dies, and an average of 83 people are wounded, every day on Karachi roads. Shahrah-e-Faisal is considered to be the deadliest road.

References

Streets in Karachi